Ho Mann Jahaan is a 2015 Pakistani coming-of-age musical drama film, written and directed by Asim Raza at his directorial debut. The screenplay was written by Rashna Abdi, Imtisal Abbasi and Asim Raza, while dialogues were written by Asim Raza, Imtisal Abbasi, Rashna Abdi and Yasir Hussain. The film stars Adeel Hussain, Mahira Khan, Sheheryar Munawar and Sonya Jehan, along with veterans Bushra Ansari, Arshad Mahmud, Jamal Shah and Munawar Siddiqui. It is produced in Urdu.

The film was released in the Middle East on 31 December 2015 by  ARY Films and on 1 January 2016 in Pakistan.

The film opened to a highly successful box office weekend and went on to run for several weeks, making it one the highest-grossing films of 2016. In Dec 2016 Ho Mann Jahaan was showcased at the Pakistani Film Festival in New York City.

Plot 

Ho Mann Jahaan is a coming-of-age urban story set in present-day Karachi. The film revolves around three main characters – Arhan (Sheheryar Munawar), Manizeh (Mahira Khan), and Nadir (Adeel Husain). The story is about their friendship born out of shared experiences, passion for music, and aspiration for fame. Sonya Jehan plays the role of Sabina, a powerful independent character symbolizing strength and wisdom. The film is a reflection of the struggle between individuals seeking to exercise free will but also attracted to conformity. Parents impose restrictions and dictate terms, because they love their children but at times don't understand them.

Cast 
 Mahira Khan as Manizeh
 Adeel Hussain as Nadir
 Sheheryar Munawar as Arhan
 Sonya Jehan as Sabina 
 Bushra Ansari as Nadir's mother 
 Arshad Mehmood as Nadir's father
 Nimra Bucha as Shahida 
 Jamal Shah as Manizeh's father
 Munawar Siddiqui as Arhan's father
 Fawad Khan (cameo appearance) as Rafael
 Zeb Bangash (cameo appearance) as Xenovia
 Hamza Ali Abbasi (cameo appearance) as Malang Baba 
 Syra Yousuf (cameo appearance) in the "Shakar Wandaan" Song
 Bilal Maqsood (cameo appearance)
 Faisal Kapadia (cameo appearance)
 Zoheb Hassan (cameo appearance)
 Ahmed Ali Akbar (extended cameo)
 Ali Zia Naqvi (cameo appearance)
 Syed Faizan Ali (cameo appearance)

Production 
The film was primarily shot in Karachi, and some parts were shot in the northern areas of Pakistan. The film was shot using two Alexa cameras with two camera units.  The film's first teaser was released on 25 March 2015  where the cast and crew got together for a press event at the film's largest and one of the industry's most expensive sets.

Soundtrack 
The soundtrack was digitally released on 1 November 2015. It comprises a total of ten songs by various artists. The album contains only three original tracks, written by Asim Raza; the rest of the songs were re-recorded by artists who had previously performed them. The album was produced by Faakhir and Ehtisham Malick at ET studios. The song "Khush Piya" was dedicated to Malika Pukhraj by Tina Sani.

Track listing

Release 
The film was originally scheduled to be released on the holiday of Eid al-Azha on 25 September 2015, but was rescheduled for release on 1 January 2016.

Critical reception 
The film generally received mixed reviews. Rafay Mehmood of Express Tribune rated 2 out of 5 stars and criticised its script and camera work and said "Ho Mann Jahaan is a failed marriage between advertisement and film, and the rest is just too long to sit and absorb". Hamna Zubair of Dawn News praised its well selected cast and their acting. The editor also praised its strong hitting social message and wrote that "Ho Mann Jahaan succeeds in its aim to entertain, and I'm happy for everyone involved. Go watch the film, you'll like it". Fatima Aleem of nation gave it a rating of 7 out of 10 and praised the film's content and marked that "Movie had a good lesson for parents to let their children choose the career line they want to opt rather than compelling them to fulfill their dreams and live a life they never wished for".Editor of Dunya News praised The Direction but criticised its predictable storyline and mainly praised Shehreyar Munawar's acting but pointed out more negatives than positives. Haider Janjua praised the film especially its actors and wrote that "All in all, Ho Mann Jahan is a really great and entertaining movie. Yes, it wasn't perfect and there is always room for improvement especially in the story department but the great thing for me which made it such a compelling and heartfelt movie was the messages that it had hidden in the shining glossy wrapping". Ujala Ali Khan of The National highly praised the film and wrote that"A highly relatable story featuring likeable characters, teamed with great performances by both the lead and supporting actors, makes for an easy, pleasant viewing experience".
Galaxy Lollywood rated it 3 out of 5  stars and wrote that "Good performances by the lead actors, great music, some special guest appearances and a slowly moving plot await you. Its not the best that Pakistani Cinema has offered, but then its not the worst either".

Adnan Murad of the Blasting News gave film 3 out of 5 stars and praised the film's screenplay and wrote "‘Ho Mann Jahaan’ works brilliantly because of some tremendous and understated work from all departments. The dialogues are refreshingly witty but quite cheesy at some instances. However, the casual dialogue writing makes it easier for the viewers to relate with the characters".

Adnan Sarym of HIP gave a rating of 4 out of 5

Accolades

References

External links 
 
 

2015 films
Films shot in Karachi
Films set in Karachi
Animated films about music and musicians
Pakistani coming-of-age films
Pakistani romantic drama films
2015 romantic drama films
Lollywood films
2010s Urdu-language films
Films shot in Gilgit-Baltistan
2015 directorial debut films
Films directed by Asim Raza